The Disappearance of McKinley Nolan is a 2010 documentary film directed by Henry Corra, which follows Michael Nolan on the search for his brother McKinley Nolan, a U.S. Army Private who vanished during the Vietnam War.

The circumstances of McKinley's disappearance were mysterious, and his status and whereabouts became classified  U.S. military information to which the Nolan family was denied access. Retired Lt. Dan Smith returned 40 years later to the U.S. from Tay Ninh, Vietnam having encountered a nameless American man whom he later photo-identified as McKinley Nolan.

The search for McKinley is a deeply personal journey for his brother Michael and includes groundbreaking footage and interviews of former Khmer Rouge and Viet Cong members.

Cast
Michael Nolan: McKinley Nolan's brother
Mary Nolan: McKinley Nolan's wife
Frank Wagner
Richard Linnett: Journalist researching McKinley's story
Lt. Dan Smith: Vietnam Veteran
Roger Nolan: McKinley Nolan's son
R.L. Brown: Mary Nolan's brother
Robert Lee Brown Sr.: Mary Nolan's Father
Congresswoman Sheila Jackson Lee: Assisted the Nolans
Thach Quang: McKinley Nolan's adopted son
Ms. Hoa
Mr. and Mrs. Cong
Benjamin David Reich: Interpreter
Cham Sone: Former Khmer Rouge guard
Nguyen Van Tinh
Dang Thuan Hoa
Nguyen Van Thien
Nguyen Van Tuoi
Dao Sy To
Tit Ream
Thol Koung
Ung Chun
Ou Seng Heang
Ta Sonn
Sarah Thomas: Interpreter
Denny Danielson

Production
Production began in 2006 after the story was brought to director Henry Corra by Journalist Richard Linnet, who had been following the case for 12 years. Captivated by the Nolans' longing to find McKinley, Corra traveled to Texas to meet them. The timing was perfect, as retired Lt. Dan Smith was scheduling his first meeting with the Nolan family with the news that he saw McKinley Nolan alive.

In the 40 years since McKinley's disappearance, U.S. government cooperation with the Nolan family in their search had been extremely limited. When the filmmakers attempted to gain access to areas in Vietnam and Cambodia where McKinley Nolan was rumored to be, they were denied access on all fronts by the U.S., Vietnamese, and Cambodian governments. Through the efforts of Congresswoman Sheila Jackson Lee, the crew and the Nolan family were able to secure travel visas and permission for entry, as well as access to military records regarding McKinley Nolan.

Actor and activist Danny Glover and Joslyn Barnes of Louverture Films joined the project as Executive Producers, as did Jim Butterworth and Daniel Chalfen of Naked Edge Films. Together with Richard Linnett, Lt. Dan Smith, and several interpreters, the team collected groundbreaking evidence regarding the Khmer Rouge and Viet Cong in their search for McKinley Nolan.

See also
Henry Corra
Danny Glover
Sheila Jackson Lee
Khmer Rouge
Vietnam War

References

External links
 
 
 Arts of War on the Web review
 McKinley Nolan at Corra Films, Inc.
POW network in regard to McKinlay Nolan

2010 films
American documentary films
2010 documentary films
Documentary films about the Vietnam War
Nolan
2010s English-language films
2010s American films